Slow Wine Mixtape is the debut mixtape by Spanish singer Bad Gyal. It was released on 9 November 2016 independently. It was presented with two singles: "Mercadona" and "Fiebre". It includes collaborations with Ms Nina and Elvis KNK. Regarding the title, "wine" is in Jamaican patois a type of dance similar to twerking.

Critical reception

Yeray S. Iborra of Mondo Sonoro stated that with Slow Wine Mixtape, Bad Gyal "dissociates herself from the disruptive nature of trap to embrace what she always considered her musical origins: Jamaican music", and that "night, money or love are part of a concept that clashes with the purism of those who wanted to see in [her] a banner of political commitment."

Track listing
Credits adapted from Tidal.

Personnel
Credits adapted from Tidal and other sources.

 Bad Gyal – primary vocals
 Ms Nina – featured vocals (track 2)
 Elvis KNK – featured vocals (track 6)
 Plata – production (tracks 1, 7)
 AC3 – production (track 2)
 Fakeguido – production (tracks 3, 5)
 King DouDou – production (track 4)
 Faberoa – production (track 6)
 Darío Alva – artwork

Charts

Release history

References

2016 mixtape albums
Albums recorded in a home studio
Bad Gyal albums
Debut mixtape albums
Self-released albums
Spanish-language albums